Paris Saint-Germain Boxing, commonly known as Paris Saint-Germain and familiarly as PSG Boxing, was a French professional boxing club founded in 1992, and based in the city of Paris in France. The club was the boxing department of Paris Saint-Germain until 1997.

An initiative from former French professional boxer Jean-Claude Bouttier, PSG boxers trained at a boxing gym located inside Parc des Princes. PSG Boxing consisted of club president Bouttier, managers René Acquaviva and Gilbert Delé, and boxers Philippe Desavoye, Djamel Lifa, Julien Lorcy, Hacine Cherifi, Patrice Aouissi, Ludovic Proto, Philippe Michel, Jean-Claude M'Biye and Khalid Rahilou.

In only five years, PSG boxers won six French Championships, three European Championships and one World Championship. However, René Acquaviva's departure in 1997 and the lack of support from the French Boxing Federation saw parent club Paris Saint-Germain dissolve PSG Boxing later that same year.

History

Early years and French titles

In September 1992, a few months after basketball, volleyball, handball and judo, parent club Paris Saint-Germain created its boxing department under the direction of Jean-Claude Bouttier, a former European middleweight champion in the 1970s. Under former French boxing team manager René Acquaviva, five boxers joined Paris Saint-Germain Boxing: Philippe Desavoye, Djamel Lifa, Julien Lorcy, Hacine Cherifi and Patrice Aouissi.

These five boxing prospects had participated in the 1992 Summer Olympics in Barcelona, Spain, before discovering professional boxing with PSG. In September 1993, Jean-Claude Bouttier opened a boxing gym inside Parc des Princes, as well as hiring former WBA super-welterweight champion Gilbert Delé.

In early 1994, two PSG boxers became French champions - Lifa and Aouissi - while another, Cherifi, missed out and quickly left the club. In May, club president Bouttier confirmed that PSG Boxing would welcome further boxers. Later that year, the club recruited Ludovic Proto, Philippe Michel, Tshimanga M'Biye and current European light-welterweight champion Khalid Rahilou.

European success

In March 1995, Aouissi became PSG's first European champion. He claimed the cruiserweight title after knocking out Ukrainian fighter Alexander Gurov in the third round. In October 1995, Philippe Michel fought for the WBO light-heavyweight title against German pugilist Dariusz Michalczewski, losing by unanimous decision. Lorcy and Rahilou, for their part, had a better year. The former had a successful tour in the United States, while the latter successfully defended his European title in September, winning by technical knockout against Denmark's Søren Fjordback Søndergaard.

In February 1996, Djamel Lifa tried his luck at the European super-featherweight title, but lost on points to Russian fighter Anatoly Alexandrov. In July, a second PSG boxer had his world title chance, but Patrice Aouissi bowed to the Argentine Marcelo Domínguez by technical knockout in the ninth round. Following the fight, tensions between manager René Acquaviva and Aouissi arose due to the former's coaching. Lorcy, in contrast, was crowned European champion at the end of the year, knocking out Russian pugilist Boris Sinitsin in the seventh round.

World title and dissolution

In January 1997, Khalid Rahilou became WBA super-lightweight champion after defeating American fighter Frankie Randall at Nashville by technical knockout in the eleventh round. It was the first time since Alphonse Halimi in 1957 that a French boxer won the WBA title in the USA. Meanwhile, Aouissi continued his downfall by losing his European cruiserweight title against Englishman Johnny Nelson by technical knockout in the seventh round in February 1997.

A month later, Bobo Lorcy had his first attempt at the WBO super-featherweight title against Mexican pugilist Arnulfo Castillo at the Halle Georges Carpentier in Paris. The fight ended in a draw, despite Lorcy dominating in the final rounds. A rematch later that year also ended in a draw. In the meantime, Lifa was finally crowned European champion in April, defeating compatriot Moussa Sangaré via sixth-round technical knockout. He then retained the title by beating Boris Sinitsin five months later. In July, Rahilou successfully defended his WBA title as well, defeating American fighter Marty Jakubowski by technical knockout in the seventh round.

Between 1992 and 1997, PSG boxers won six French championships, three European championships and one world championship. But despite being at its peak, the departure of iconic manager René Acquaviva in the summer of 1997 signalled the premature end of PSG Boxing. Not long after, parent club Paris Saint-Germain, disappointed by the lack of support from the French Boxing Federation, dissolved one of its most decorated departments and closed the boxing gym at Parc des Princes.

Boxers

As of the 1997 season.

Personnel

As of the 1997 season.

References

External links

Official websites
PSG.FR - Site officiel du Paris Saint-Germain

Paris Saint-Germain F.C.
1992 establishments in France
Boxing clubs
Sports clubs in Paris